Ben Williams may refer to:

Sports
Ben Williams (American football, born 1954) (1954–2020), American football defensive lineman
Ben Williams (American football, born 1970), American football defensive lineman
Ben Williams (footballer, born 1900) (1900–1968), Swansea Town, Everton and Wales international footballer
Ben Williams (footballer, born 1982), English football
Ben Williams (footballer, born 1999), Welsh footballer
Ben Williams (referee) (born 1977), Australian soccer referee
Ben Williams (rugby union, born 1989), English rugby union player
Ben Williams (rugby union, born 2002), Welsh rugby union player
Ben Williams (triple jumper) (born 1992), British triple jumper
Ben Williams (cricketer, born 1992), English banker and cricketer
Ben Williams (cricketer, born 1993), English cricketer

Other
Ben Williams (actor) (1892–1959), British actor of the 1940s
Ben Williams (musician) (born 1984), American jazz bassist
Ben Ames Williams (1899–1953), American writer
Ben H. Williams (1877–1964), Industrial Workers of the World leader
Ben T. Williams (1910–1982), Oklahoma Supreme Court judge
Ben Williams (Family Affairs), character in UK soap opera Family Affairs

See also
Benjamin Williams (disambiguation)